The  Neville Bonner Bridge  is a footbridge being built across the Brisbane River in Brisbane, Australia. The bridge will connect the suburb of South Bank with the Brisbane central business district. It is named after Neville Bonner, Australia’s first Indigenous member of the Parliament of Australia. The design concept for the bridge, by Grimshaw Architects, is an arch and single mast cable-stayed bridge with continuous shading supported by one mid-river pier. A large observation deck will be located in the centre of the bridge.

Up to 10,000 people are expected to use the bridge every day. Cyclists will not be permitted to use the bridge.

History
The bridge is part of the Queen's Wharf development in the Brisbane central business district. Construction on the bridge had begun by March 2020.  During construction in June 2021, the Riverside Expressway was partially closed so that pieces of the bridge could be placed above the road. Close to the banks piles were dug 30 metres into the ground to support the structure, while in the river a depth of 35 metres was reached. The final 10-metre, 20-tonne span was placed on the morning of 27 February 2023.

Design 
The “lightweight yet dramatic” design incorporates 1,000 tonnes of fabricated structural steel, engineered to create an “elegant and efficient outcome”.
This is the same height as the Victoria and Captain Cook Bridges. The bridge will be fully shaded. 

It features two arches, each 60 metres long and weighing 90 tonnes.  The walkway will be suspended from the arches which reach a height of 30 metres above the river.

See also

Bridges over the Brisbane River
List of bridges in Brisbane

References

Proposed bridges in Australia

Bridges in Brisbane
Bridges over the Brisbane River
Brisbane central business district
Cable-stayed bridges in Australia
Pedestrian bridges in Australia
Steel bridges in Australia